Aneura may refer to:
 Aneura (fly), a genus of insects in the family Mycetophilidae
 Aneura (plant), a genus of liverworts in the family Aneuraceae